This article is about the list of Atlético Sport Aviação players.  Atlético Sport Aviação is an Angolan football (soccer) club based in Luanda, Angola and plays at Estádio da Cidadela.  The club was established in 1953.

2011–2019
Atlético Sport Aviação players 2011–2019

2001–2010
Atlético Sport Aviação players 2001–2010

1991–2000
Atlético Sport Aviação players 1991–2000

1979–1990
TAAG players 1979–1990

External links
 Girabola.com profile
 Zerozero.pt profile
 Facebook profile

References

Atletico Sport Aviacao
Atlético Sport Aviação players
Association football player non-biographical articles